How I Feel is the third studio album by Canadian country music artist Terri Clark. Released in 1998 on Mercury Nashville, the album produced the singles "Now That I Found You", "You're Easy on the Eyes", "Everytime I Cry", and "Unsung Hero". In the U.S., these singles respectively reached #2, #1, #12, and #47 on the Billboard country charts, with "You're Easy on the Eyes" being her first #1 in that country. On the RPM country charts in Canada, they reached #2, #1, #2 and #15. The album was certified platinum in both countries. "I'm Alright" was previously recorded by Kim Richey on her 1997 album Bitter Sweet while "Unsung Hero" was previously recorded by Tina Arena on her second album In Deep released in 1997.

Track listing

Personnel 
As listed in liner notes.

Musicians
Terri Clark - lead vocals
J. T. Corenflos - electric guitar
Dan Dugmore - slide guitar, steel guitar
Stuart Duncan - fiddle, mandolin
Paul Franklin - steel guitar
Sonny Garrish - steel guitar
Owen Hale - drums, percussion
John Barlow Jarvis - piano
Brent Mason - electric guitar
Gary Prim - keyboards
John Willis - acoustic guitar
Glenn Worf - bass guitar

Background vocalists
Robert Bailey
Terri Clark
Vicki Hampton
Alison Krauss (on "Cure for the Common Heartache")
Sunny Russ
John Wesley Ryles
Stephony Smith

Chart performance

Weekly charts

Year-end charts

References

1998 albums
Terri Clark albums
Mercury Nashville albums
Albums produced by Keith Stegall